William 'Bill' Crane Irish (1932-1992), was a former England international lawn and indoor bowler.

Bowls career

World Championships
He won a silver medal in the triples and bronze medal in the fours with John C Evans, Tommy Armstrong and  Peter Line at the 1976 World Outdoor Bowls Championship in Johannesburg. He also won a silver medal in the team event (Leonard Cup).

Commonwealth Games
He represented England in the fours, at the 1978 Commonwealth Games in Edmonton, Alberta, Canada.

National
He won the 1967 and 1974 singles title at the national titles and also won the singles at the British Isles Bowls Championships in 1975.

References

English male bowls players
1932 births
1992 deaths
Bowls players at the 1978 Commonwealth Games
Commonwealth Games competitors for England